Hayley Woo (born 27 December 1991) is a Singaporean actress. She was managed by JTeam JM Artiste Network from 2013 to 2017. She has an identical twin sister, Jayley Woo, who is also an actress.

Career 
Woo and her sister joined The New Paper New Face competition in 2011 and started their media career after it.

Filmography

TV series

Film

Variety Shows

Musical/Theatre

Guinness World Record

Awards and nominations

References

External links

21st-century Singaporean actresses
Singaporean television actresses
Singaporean film actresses
Singaporean people of Cantonese descent
People from Johor Bahru
1991 births
Living people